Julian Bailey (born May 25, 1977) is a Canadian actor who has had roles in feature films and television series, including Better Off Ted, NCIS, Just Shoot Me!, Judging Amy and Charmed.

Biography
Bailey first appeared to American television audiences in 2002 in the recurring role of Scott Wilson, assistant to Lea Thompson, in the Lifetime network drama, For The People. He later portrayed the comedic recurring role of Vincent, the flirtatious bartender from the 'Indigo Club' on the soap opera The Young and the Restless. 

Bailey had a supporting role in the 2009 direct-to-video release Sarah's Choice, which starred Rebecca St. James. He appeared the crime-drama film Acts of Violence, starring Ron Perlman and Leelee Sobieski in 2010 and the feature film comedy, Meeting Spencer starring Jeffrey Tambor in 2011. In 2018, he played the role of Owen in the horror film He's Out There. 

He was the voice of Pepito in the popular Madeline specials by Cinar Films, narrated by fellow Montreal native, Christopher Plummer. Bailey also did voices for several anime series, including Jungle Book Shōnen Mowgli, as Mowgli.

He has been acting since he was a child. As a youth, he was a member of The Children's Theatre of Montreal. He was an original member of The Piven Theatre Workshop Subscription Company in Evanston, Illinois, where he was mentored by Byrne Piven, father of actor Jeremy Piven.

Filmography

Film
 The Real Story of O Christmas Tree – Karl (1991)
 A Bunch of Munsch – Thomas (1992)
 The Real Story of Au Clair de La Lune – Jamie (1992)
 Christopher Columbus – Young Christopher Columbus (1992)
 Betaville – Tony Kash (2001)
 Revenge of the Middle-Aged Woman – Richard
 S.S. Doomtrooper – Jean-Michele (2006)
 Death And Taxis – Joshua (2007)
 The Long Night – Craig (2008)
 Better Off Ted – Hal (2009)
 Sarah's Choice – Matt Evans (2009)
 Acts of Violence – Tom (2010)
 Meeting Spencer – Emerson Todd (2011)
 The History of Love – Jeff (2016)
 He's Out There – Owen (2018)
 The Hummingbird Project – Elliot (2018)
 Dark Phoenix – Shuttle Commander (2019)

Television
 Ox Tales – Moe the Mole (1988)
 Jungle Book Shonen Mowgli – Mowgli (1989–1990)
 Bumpety Boo – Ken (1989)
 Nutsberry Town – Snappy Onion (1989)
 Saban's Adventures of Peter Pan – Tootles, and additional voices (1990)
 Saban's Adventures of the Little Mermaid – additional voices (1991)
 Madeline – Pepito (1991)
 The Little Lulu Show – additional voices (1995)
 For The People – Scott Wilson (2002–2003)
 Judging Amy – Clayton Leonard (2002)
 Just Shoot Me! – Nick (2003)
 NCIS – P.O. Ronald Zuger (2003)
 10-8: Officers on Duty – Kenny (2003)
 JAG – Lt. Cody Smathers (2005)
 Charmed – Copy Editor (2005)
 The Conquest of America – Admiral Coligny (2005)
 The Young and the Restless – Vincent, Bartender at Indigo (October 27, 2006 – February 2007)
 Helix – Lt. Humphries (2015)
 The Art of More – Brian Coleman (2015)
 Quantico – Agent Hayes/ND FBI Agent (2015)
 Real Detective – Detective Parson (2016)
 Three Pines - Peter Morrow (2022)

Video games
 Rainbow Six: Siege – HQ (2015)
 Deus Ex: Mankind Divided – Vlasta Novak, Additional Voices, Red Shoes Inmate (A Criminal Past DLC) (2016)
 For Honor –  Viking Soldier (2017)
 Far Cry 5 – Deputy Sheriff Staci Pratt (2018)

References

External links
 

1977 births
Canadian male child actors
Canadian male television actors
Canadian male film actors
Canadian male voice actors
Canadian male soap opera actors
Male actors from Montreal
Living people